Richard Joseph Gill (March 29, 1886 – March 7, 1959) was a lumberman and political figure in New Brunswick. He represented Northumberland County in the Legislative Assembly of New Brunswick from 1931 to his death in 1959 as a Liberal member.

He was born in Barnaby River, New Brunswick, the son of Thomas Gill and Sarah Masterson. Gill was educated at St. Francis Xavier University. In 1920, he married Estelle C. Power. He served as county warden in 1923 and 1924. In 1946, he was named Minister of Lands and Mines in the administration of Premier John B. McNair, and served through 1952.

References 
 Canadian Parliamentary Guide, 1956, PG Normandin
 Provincial Archives of New Brunswick, archives.gnb.ca

1886 births
1959 deaths
St. Francis Xavier University alumni
Businesspeople from New Brunswick
Businesspeople in timber
New Brunswick Liberal Association MLAs